Ali Saveh-Shemshaki (born 1949) is an Iranian alpine skier. He competed at the 1968 Winter Olympics and the 1972 Winter Olympics.

References

1949 births
Living people
Iranian male alpine skiers
Olympic alpine skiers of Iran
Alpine skiers at the 1968 Winter Olympics
Alpine skiers at the 1972 Winter Olympics
Sportspeople from Tehran